Bones Park is a multi-use stadium in Castries, St. Lucia.  It is currently used mostly for football matches.  The stadium holds 20,000.

Castries
Football venues in Saint Lucia
Saint Lucia